Owdak Duji (also Romanized as Owdak Dūjī; also known as Dūjī Owdak) is a village in Katul Rural District, in the Central District of Aliabad County, Golestan Province, Iran. At the 2006 census, its population was 2,221, in 444 families.

References 

Populated places in Aliabad County